Erwin Clausen (5 August 1911 – 4 October 1943) was a German Luftwaffe military aviator during World War II, a fighter ace credited with 132 aerial victories—that is, 132 aerial combat encounters resulting in the destruction of the enemy aircraft—claimed in 561 combat missions.

Born in Berlin-Steglitz, Clausen volunteered for military service with the Reichsmarine in 1931. He transferred to the Luftwaffe of Nazi Germany in 1935. Following flight training, he was posted to Lehrgeschwader 2 (LG 2—2nd Demonstration Wing). He flew his first combat missions in the invasion of Poland, claiming his first aerial victory on 9 September 1939. Clausen then fought in the Battle of France, Battle of Britain, invasion of Yugoslavia and Operation Barbarossa, the German invasion of the Soviet Union. In June 1942, he was appointed Staffelkapitän (squadron leader) of 6. Staffel (6th squadron) of Jagdgeschwader 77 (JG 77—77th Fighter Wing). One month later, he was awarded the Knight's Cross of the Iron Cross followed by the Knight's Cross of the Iron Cross with Oak Leaves on 23 July 1942 after 101 victories.

In June 1943, Clausen was appointed Gruppenkommandeur (group commander) of I. Gruppe of Jagdgeschwader 11 (JG 11—11th Fighter Wing), tasked with defense of the Reich missions. He was posted as missing in action after aerial combat over the North Sea on 4 October 1943. He was promoted to Major (major) posthumously.

Early life and career
Clausen was born on 5 August 1911 in Berlin-Steglitz, the son of a master craftsman (Meister) joiner. Before joining military service, he worked in his father's company. He joined the Reichsmarine, the German Navy during the Weimar Republic, in 1931. In 1935, Clausen transferred to the newly emerging Luftwaffe of the Nazi Germany. Holding the rank of Unteroffizier (subordinate officer or lance sergeant), he received flight training.

World War II
World War II in Europe had begun on Friday, 1 September 1939, when German forces invaded Poland. Clausen, now a Feldwebel (sergeant), had been assigned to the 3.(Jagd)/ LG 2, the 3. Staffel (3rd squadron) of Lehrgeschwader 2 (LG 2—2nd Demonstration Wing) before the outbreak of hostilities. This squadron was subordinated to I.(Jagd) Gruppe (1st group) of LG 2.
On 9 September 1939, I.(Jagd) Gruppe was ordered to relocate to an airfield at Lauenburg west of Bydgoszcz. On the afternoon (16:06 – 17:10) of that day, the Gruppe flew a combat air patrol mission, and for the first time of the war 3. Staffel had enemy contact. In this encounter, Clausen claimed his first aerial victory when he shot down a PWS-26 biplane trainer. On 17 September, he received the Iron Cross 2nd Class. Following the Battle of the Bzura on 20 September, I.(Jagd) Gruppe was ordered to relocate to Graz-Thalerhof.

Battle of France and Britain
On 30 September, the Gruppe moved to an airfield at Uetersen, flying defensive missions over the German Bight. The unit relocated multiple times and was flying in defense of the Reich from Esbjerg on 10 May 1940, the start of the Battle of France. On 14 May, I.(Jagd) Gruppe transferred to Essen-Mülheim for operations against France. Two days later, I.(Jagd) Gruppe was tasked with providing fighter escort for German transports resupplying the 4th Army in the vicinity of Cambrai. On this mission, Clausen claimed an Armée de l'air Potez 63 twin-engined aircraft shot down. In this encounter, his Messerschmitt Bf 109 E was also damaged, resulting in a forced landing near Cambrai. On 15 June, I.(Jagd) Gruppe was moved to Saint-Omer, the armistice was signed on 22 June, ending the Battle of France on 25 June. The unit was given three days of rest, some of the pilots were sent on home leave. On 30 June, I.(Jagd) Gruppe was scrambled to intercept a flight of Royal Air Force Bristol Blenheim bombers resulting in combat southwest of Saint-Omer. In this encounter, Clausen claimed a Blenheim from No. 110 Squadron shot down which was not confirmed but was himself shot down in his Bf 109 E. Clausen was awarded the Iron Cross 1st Class on 4 July 1940 and was promoted to Oberleutnant (first lieutenant) on 1 February 1941. That day, Clausen was also appointed Staffelkapitän (squadron leader) of 1.(Jagd) Staffel of LG 2, this squadron became the 1. Staffel of Jagdgeschwader 77 (JG 77—77th Fighter Wing) on 6 January 1942.

Leading this squadron, Clausen participated in the Balkan Campaign. On 6 April 1941, he recorded three victories during the invasion of Yugoslavia, these were Hawker Fury fighters of the Yugoslav Royal Air Force's 36th Fighter Group shot down over Režanovačka Kosa airfield near Kumanovo. This resulted in the presentation of the Honour Goblet of the Luftwaffe on 20 June 1941.

Eastern Front
Following the Balkan Campaign, I.(Jagd)/LG 2 was again subordinated to Jagdgeschwader 77 (JG 77—77th Fighter Wing) on 18 June 1941 and was moved to Bucharest, Romania in preparation for Operation Barbarossa, the German invasion of the Soviet Union on 22 June 1941. JG 77 supported the German advance as part of Heeresgruppe Süd (Army Group South). On 21 June, the Gruppe was ordered to Roman, a forward airfield near the Siret river. Clausen claimed his first aerial victory on the Eastern Front, his seventh overall, on 2 July 1941. The mission, the second of the day, a combat air patrol encountered a flight of a Polikarpov I-153 biplane fighters east of Iași. Later that afternoon, on the fourth mission of the day, he claimed another I-153 shot down.

On 3 and 4 February 1942, Clausen and Oberleutnant Friedrich Geißhardt shot down three Polikarpov R-5s or Polikarpov R-Zs of 622 LBAP (Legkii Bombardirovochnyy Aviatsionyy Polk—Light Bomber Aviation Regiment) and 672 LBAP. Clausen became an "ace-in-a-day" for the first time on 9 March 1942, claiming aerial victories 36 to 40. Following the Battle of the Kerch Peninsula, his total had reached 52 aerial victories on 6 April 1942. For this he was awarded the German Cross in Gold on 18 May 1942, a direct presentation by Reichsmarschall Hermann Göring. Four days later, he was also honored with the Knight's Cross of the Iron Cross.

On 27 June 1942, Clausen was transferred to 6. Staffel of JG 77 and appointed its Staffelkapitän. On 21 July 1942, he claimed four victories, three Pe-2s and one LaGG-3. He reached his 100th victory after he claimed six further victories the next day. Shooting down a LaGG-3, a Hurricane and three Il-2s, took his tally to 101 aerial victories. Clausen was the 12th Luftwaffe pilot to achieve the century mark. For this achievement, he was awarded the Knight's Cross of the Iron Cross with Oak Leaves on 23 July 1943. He was the 106th member of the German armed forces to be so honored. Clausen and together with Oberleutnant Viktor Bauer were presented the Oak Leaves by Adolf Hitler at the Führerhauptquartier at Rastenburg.

On 5 December, II. Gruppe of JG 77 was transferred to the North African theater, arriving at an airfield near Janzur, located west of Tripoli. Clausen initially stayed in Europe because he had become ill with Malaria. During his absence, Leutnant Johann Badum temporarily assumed command of 6. Staffel.

Defense of the Reich and death
Clausen, who for his facial features was nicknamed 'Caesar', was transferred to the Ergänzungs-Jagdgruppe Süd (Supplementary Fighter Group, South) on 1 February 1943, and promoted to Hauptmann (captain). On 20 June 1943, Clausen was appointed Gruppenkommandeur (group commander) of I. Gruppe of Jagdgeschwader 11 (JG 11—11th Fighter Wing), succeeding Major Walter Spies. This Gruppe was based in Husum and flew in defense of the Reich against the United States Army Air Forces (USAAF) Eighth Air Force. On 17 July 1943, 332 heavy bombers of the 1st and 4th Bombardment Wing planned on targeting Hanover and Hamburg. The plan had to be abandoned due to changing weather conditions. Elements of 4th Bombardment Wing were already airborne and aimed at targeting the Fokker aircraft manufacturing sites at Amsterdam. In defense of this attack, Clausen claimed his 121st aerial victory, a Boeing B-17 Flying Fortress shot down at 09:42.

On 4 October 1943, the USAAF targeted and bombed Frankfurt am Main. The exact circumstances of his death remain unknown, he made his last radio communication at 10:28, confirming the order to return to base. At the time, his wife and three children had been living with him at the Husum airbase. Clausen was posthumously promoted to Major (major), the promotion backdated to 1 October 1943. Three of his brothers were also killed in action during World War II.

Summary of career

Aerial victory claims
According to US historian David T. Zabecki, Clausen was credited with 132 aerial victories. Spick also lists Clausen with 132 aerial victories with some unconfirmed victories in 561 combat missions. He claimed one victory over Poland, three over Yugoslavia, 17 victories over the Western Front, including 14 four-engined bombers, with the remaining victories achieved over the Eastern Front. Mathews and Foreman, authors of Luftwaffe Aces — Biographies and Victory Claims, researched the German Federal Archives and found documentation for 100 aerial victory claims, plus one further unconfirmed claim. This number includes 1 claim over Poland, 3 over Yugoslavia, 16 on the Western Front, including 10 four-engined bombers, and 84 on the Eastern Front.

Victory claims were logged to a map-reference (PQ = Planquadrat), for example "PQ 75234". These sectors were then subdivided into 36 smaller units to give a location area 3 × 4 km in size.

Awards
 Iron Cross (1939)
 2nd Class (17 September 1939)
 1st Class (4 July 1940)
 Honour Goblet of the Luftwaffe (20 June 1941)
 German Cross in Gold on 18 May 1942 Oberleutnant in the I./Jagdgeschwader 77
 Knight's Cross of the Iron Cross with Oak Leaves
 Knight's Cross on 22 May 1942 as Oberleutnant and Staffelkapitän of the 6./Jagdgeschwader 77
 106th Oak Leaves on 23 July 1942 as Oberleutnant and pilot in the 1./Jagdgeschwader 77

See also
List of people who disappeared mysteriously at sea

Notes

References

Citations

Bibliography

 
 
 
 
 
 
 
 
 
 
 
 
 
 
 
 
 
 
 
 
 
 

1911 births
1940s missing person cases
1943 deaths
Aerial disappearances of military personnel in action
Aviators killed by being shot down
Luftwaffe personnel killed in World War II
German World War II flying aces
Luftwaffe pilots
Military personnel from Berlin
Missing aviators
Missing in action of World War II
Missing person cases in Germany
People lost at sea
Reichsmarine personnel
Recipients of the Gold German Cross
Recipients of the Knight's Cross of the Iron Cross with Oak Leaves
People from Steglitz-Zehlendorf